In geometry, an octahedral prism is a convex uniform 4-polytope. This 4-polytope has 10 polyhedral cells: 2 octahedra connected by 8 triangular prisms.

Alternative names 
Octahedral dyadic prism (Norman W. Johnson) 
Ope (Jonathan Bowers, for octahedral prism) 
Triangular antiprismatic prism 
Triangular antiprismatic hyperprism

Coordinates 
It is a Hanner polytope with vertex coordinates, permuting first 3 coordinates:
([±1,0,0]; ±1)

Structure 

The octahedral prism consists of two octahedra connected to each other via 8 triangular prisms. The triangular prisms are joined to each other via their square faces.

Projections 

The octahedron-first orthographic projection of the octahedral prism into 3D space has an octahedral envelope. The two octahedral cells project onto the entire volume of this envelope, while the 8 triangular prismic cells project onto its 8 triangular faces.

The triangular-prism-first orthographic projection of the octahedral prism into 3D space has a hexagonal prismic envelope. The two octahedral cells project onto the two hexagonal faces. One triangular prismic cell projects onto a triangular prism at the center of the envelope, surrounded by the images of 3 other triangular prismic cells to cover the entire volume of the envelope. The remaining four triangular prismic cells are projected onto the entire volume of the envelope as well, in the same arrangement, except with opposite orientation.

Related polytopes 
It is the second in an infinite series of uniform antiprismatic prisms.

It is one of 18 uniform polyhedral prisms created by using uniform prisms to connect pairs of parallel Platonic solids and Archimedean solids.

It is one of four four-dimensional Hanner polytopes; the other three are the tesseract, the 16-cell, and the dual of the octahedral prism (a cubical bipyramid).

References

 John H. Conway, Heidi Burgiel, Chaim Goodman-Strass, The Symmetries of Things 2008,  (Chapter 26)
 Norman Johnson Uniform Polytopes, Manuscript (1991)

External links 
 
 

4-polytopes